The 2002 Texas Tech Red Raiders football team represented Texas Tech University as a member of the Big 12 Conference during the 2002 NCAA Division I-A football season. In their third season under head coach Mike Leach, the Red Raiders compiled a 9–5 record (5–3 against Big 12 opponents), finished in a tie for third place in Southern Division of the Big 12, defeated Clemson in the 2002 Tangerine Bowl, and outscored opponents by a combined total of 537 to 439. The team played its home games at Jones SBC Stadium in Lubbock, Texas.

Quarterback Kliff Kingsbury totaled 5,017 passing yards and received the Sammy Baugh Trophy. Lawrence Flugence set the NCAA single-season record for most tackles.

Schedule

Roster

Game summaries

at Ohio State

at SMU

Ole Miss

NC State

at New Mexico

at Texas A&M

at Iowa State

Missouri

at Colorado

Baylor

Oklahoma State

Texas

at Oklahoma

vs. Clemson (Tangerine Bowl)

Team players in the NFL

References

Texas Tech
Texas Tech Red Raiders football seasons
Cheez-It Bowl champion seasons
Texas Tech Red Raiders football